Oleksandr Maksymovych Kapliyenko (born 7 March 1996) is a Ukrainian professional footballer who plays as a left-back for Dnipro-1.

Career
Kapliyenko is product of youth team system Metalurh Zaporizhzhia.

Made his debut for Metalurh Zaporizhzhia playing a full-time game against Chornomorets Odesa on 6 April 2014 in Ukrainian Premier League.

He made his debut in the Russian Football National League for Torpedo Moscow on 27 February 2021 in a game against SKA-Khabarovsk.

References

External links
 
 

1996 births
Living people
Footballers from Zaporizhzhia
Ukrainian footballers
Ukraine youth international footballers
Ukraine under-21 international footballers
Association football defenders
Ukrainian expatriate footballers
Expatriate footballers in Turkey
Ukrainian expatriate sportspeople in Turkey
Expatriate footballers in Belarus
Ukrainian expatriate sportspeople in Belarus
Expatriate footballers in Georgia (country)
Ukrainian expatriate sportspeople in Georgia (country)
Expatriate footballers in Russia
Ukrainian expatriate sportspeople in Russia
Expatriate footballers in Latvia
Ukrainian expatriate sportspeople in Latvia
Ukrainian Premier League players
Ukrainian Second League players
Belarusian Premier League players
Erovnuli Liga players
Russian Premier League players
Latvian Higher League players
FC Metalurh Zaporizhzhia players
FC Metalist Kharkiv players
Alanyaspor footballers
FC Chornomorets Odesa players
FC Smolevichi players
FC Dinamo Tbilisi players
FC Tambov players
FC Torpedo Moscow players
FK Auda players
SC Dnipro-1 players